Oleksandr Andriyovych Harmash (Garmash) (1890–June 1940) - was a  Ukrainian and Soviet scientist in the field of production line methods in construction (construction engineering), professor of the Dnipropetrovsk Building Institute.

Life and work 
Having graduated from the Kyiv Polytechnic Institute in 1916, Oleksandr Garmash worked on major construction projects of the USSR. He designs and supervises over construction of 15 multiple-arch and concrete bridges in the Ukrainian SSR, including regions of the Dnipropetrovsk oblast, works in special board on locking the Dnieper river. Under his projects and supervision there were built the arch and concrete bridge in the Hloba park, buildings of the sewing and shoe factories in Dnipropetrovsk. He contributed to the creation of the industrial base of the Dnieper Hydroelectric Station and organization of industrial construction of the Dneprostal enterprise.

He worked as a teacher in the Katerynoslavska Building Technical Evening School, since 1930 - in Dnipropetrovsk Building Institute on positions of the deputy director on educational and research work, chief of the chairs of organization of construction works, and construction operations. From 1932 – he is a member of editorial board of the editorial-publishing house «State Building Technical Publishing». He works as research supervisor of the scientific and research sector of the Institute. In 1937-1938 he acted as director of the Institute, later – worked as deputy director of the Institute.

Prof. O.A. Harmash worked in the field of production line methods in construction. His research was focused, among other things, on liquidation of seasonality in construction activities: in 1931 he publishes his book «Construction activities in winter», in 1933 he begins his experimental work on electric heating of concrete. Materials and results of these research projects were presented in his book «Electric heating of concrete». Another important contribution to the line production methods in construction was his work «Organization and mechanization of transport in civil construction work» (1934). In his dissertation «Blast-furnace slags and their rational use» he had for the first time grounded the theory of production line methods in construction. O.A. Harmash had suggested for the first time a theoretical justification for the calculation and design of construction process with the help of mathematical methods (1939).

Publications 
He is the author of the following works:
 А. А. Garmash. Construction work. — Part I.: Concreting in frost. — 1931.
 А. А. Garmash. Organization and mechanization of transport in civil construction work. — 1934.
 А. А. Garmash. Theory of construction process. — 1939.

References

Further reading 
 Гармаш Олександр Андрійович // Вісник ПДАБтаА. — 1998. — № 4. — С. 9.
 History of Prydniprovska State Academy of Civil Engineernig and Architecture
 Развитие строительной науки и техники в Украинской ССР: в 3 т. – Т.2.: Строительная наука и техника в Украинской ССР в 1917-1941 гг. – К.:1990.
 Soviet Ukraine. – Kiev: Chief Editorial Board of the Ukrainian Soviet Encyclopedia, 1969. – P. 451.

Scientists from Dnipro
1890 births
1940 deaths
20th-century Ukrainian engineers
Ukrainian bridge engineers
Ukrainian civil engineers
Soviet civil engineers